Sadad ( / ALA-LC: Ṣadad) is a town in Syria, 60 kilometers (37 mi) south of Homs, and 101 kilometers (63 mi) northeast of Damascus. It had over 3,500 inhabitants in the 2004 census, the majority of whom belonged to the Syriac Orthodox Church.

History

Early history

Sadad is an ancient village; it is thought to be the "Zedad" ( / Tzedad; translated as "Sedada" in the Vulgate) mentioned in the Old Testament (Book of Numbers, ; Book of Ezekiel), on the northeastern boundary of the biblical land of Canaan, the land promised to the Israelites.

Isolated on the edge of the desert, the community has remained predominantly Syriac Orthodox, including after the Muslim conquest of Syria in the mid-7th century. Aramaic is still spoken in the village. Sadad had been an important bishopric in the past. There was a close connection between Sadad and the Monastery of Saint Moses the Abyssinian; according to Istifan al-Duwayhi, some of the monks of that monastery came from Sadad.

Modern era
In 1838, its inhabitants were noted as being  predominantly Syriac Christians.

In a report of 1881, a French military attaché described the state of insecurity of Sadad, whose inhabitants seemed to suffer attacks from the Bedouins. Despite the tax its inhabitants regularly paid to the tribes that camped in the region, Sadad remained in constant risk of raiding. The inhabitants had therefore created adobe barricades around the village and its surrounding gardens, thus preventing anyone on horseback to enter without dismounting, which an isolated Bedouin rarely did in enemy territory.

Anthropologist Sulayman Jabbur, writing in the 1980s, noted that most of Sadad's working inhabitants made their income in the textile industry, primarily weaving abayas (robes) and woolen mats for the Bedouin tribesmen of the vicinity. The Bedouin usually acquired their clothing from villages along the desert fringes, such as Sadad, and the latter's inhabitants sold their products either directly to the Bedouin or indirectly via local merchants. According to Jabbur, the craft of weaving abayas was an ancient tradition passed down by generation to Sadad's inhabitants. Sadad was the most important market town for the Bedouin of the region, where they came to purchase clothing, tent equipment, saddles, coffee beans, tea and other supplies.

During the Syrian Civil War, on 21 October 2013, the town was overrun by Islamist militants reportedly belonging to the al-Nusra Front, who set up loudspeakers in the main square, calling for residents to return to their houses. At least nine people were reported killed, as Syrian Army forces were sent in on 22 October to try and retake the town, sparking fierce resistance from the militants. Locals were unsure as to the reason behind the attack, though medical supplies within the town's hospital were a possibility, as well as the presence of a military depot nearby. By 28 October, the Syrian Arab Army had taken back control of Sadad. Visiting church leaders and returning villagers found two mass graves of civilians, including women and children, containing 30 bodies. They were suspected of being massacred by al-Nusra Front militants. Forty-five Christians were killed during the rebel occupation, and several churches were also looted.

Demographics
The majority of the inhabitants are Christians belonging to the Syriac Orthodox Church. According to the Syriac Orthodox patriarch, Mor Ignatius Aphrem Karim II, Sadad had a population of 15,000 in the summer of 2015, but following the advance of ISIL forces in the area in the fall, about 2,000 inhabitants remained.

Main sights
The village is well known for its several churches, in particular, the church of Mar Sarkis and the church of Saint Theodore, both of which have elaborate, ancient frescoes; it is indeed unusual to find paintings on the walls of Syrian churches.

Notable residents
Barsum Hilal of Sadad, priest and calligrapher in the 16th century.
Abu Firas al-Hamdani, Baghdadi prince and poet buried at Sadad.
Ignatius Abded Aloho II, Syriac Orthodox Patriarch.

References

Bibliography

Populated places in Homs District
Syriac Orthodox Christian communities in Syria
Towns in Syria